Sirajul Haq is politician of Bangladesh Nationalist Party, veteran of the Mukti Bahini, former Member of Parliament for Jamalpur-5 constituency and former Deputy Minister of Health.

Early life 
Haq was born in Jamalpur District.

Career 
Haq was elected Member of Parliament from Jamalpur-5 constituency on the nomination of Bangladesh Nationalist Party in the 5th Parliamentary Election of 1991 and 6th Parliamentary Election of February 1996. In the First Khaleda Cabinet, he served as Deputy Minister of Health.

Haq was defeated in the seventh parliamentary elections of June 1996, the eighth parliamentary elections of 2001 and the ninth parliamentary elections of 2008 with the nomination of BNP from the same constituency.

See also 
 List of members of the 5th Jatiya Sangsad
 List of members of the 6th Jatiya Sangsad

References 

6th Jatiya Sangsad members
5th Jatiya Sangsad members
Bangladesh Nationalist Party politicians
Living people
People from Jamalpur District
Mukti Bahini personnel
Year of birth missing (living people)